David Bruce Smith (born 14 November 1943) is a Scottish former professional football player and manager.

Playing career
Primarily a left sided midfielder, Smith started his playing career for Aberdeen and moved to Rangers in August 1966 for a fee of £50,000. During his time at Ibrox, he made 303 appearances winning the Scottish League Cup in 1971, the Scottish Cup in 1973 and, most notably, the UEFA Cup Winners' Cup in 1972. That year, he was voted the Scottish Football Writers' Association's Player of the year.

During his career he collected two Scotland caps, featuring twice in Friendly matches against the Netherlands

Coaching career
Smith left Ibrox in November 1974 for Arbroath, where he took up a player-coach role. He went on to become a player-manager at Berwick Rangers in 1976 and, while there, he transformed the club's fortunes, guiding them to the Scottish Second Division championship in 1979. He left Berwick in 1980 and subsequently managed Huntly, Gala Fairydean and Whitehill Welfare.

Smith spent one close season during his career playing for the Seattle Sounders and the Los Angeles Aztecs in the NASL and is also known to have played in South Africa.

Personal life
Smith had two brothers who were also professional footballers: Doug, who spent his entire career with Dundee United, and Hugh, who played for Forfar Athletic and Morton.

References

External links
Rangers hall of fame
NASL stats

1943 births
Living people
Footballers from Aberdeen
Scottish footballers
Association football midfielders
Scotland international footballers
Scottish Football League representative players
Scotland under-23 international footballers
Aberdeen F.C. players
Rangers F.C. players
Arbroath F.C. players
Seattle Sounders (1974–1983) players
Los Angeles Aztecs players
Berwick Rangers F.C. players
Livingston F.C. players
Hamilton Academical F.C. players
Huntly F.C. players
Scottish Football League players
North American Soccer League (1968–1984) players
Scottish football managers
Berwick Rangers F.C. managers
Peterhead F.C. managers
Scottish Football League managers
Scottish expatriate footballers
Scottish expatriate sportspeople in South Africa
Scottish expatriate sportspeople in the United States
Expatriate soccer players in South Africa
Expatriate soccer players in the United States
Highland Football League managers